The 40th Annual American Music Awards was held on November 18, 2012 at the Nokia Theatre L.A. Live in Los Angeles. The awards recognized the most popular artists and albums from the year 2012. It was broadcast live on ABC. The nominees were announced on October 9, 2012 by Christina Aguilera. This year included a brand new category, Electronic Dance Music. Justin Bieber won all three of his nominations, and of each of their four nominations, Nicki Minaj won two, and Rihanna one. Katy Perry won one of her 2 nominations, whereas Adele and Taylor Swift each won the award for which they were nominated.

Performers

Presenters

Elisha Cuthbert
Kelly Rowland
Ryan Seacrest
Eric Stonestreet
Lucy Hale
Phillip Phillips
Randy Jackson
Stacy Keibler
Ne-Yo
Cyndi Lauper
Karmin
Kerry Washington
Apolo Ohno
Florida Georgia Line
Jennifer Morrison
Ginnifer Goodwin
Lady Antebellum
Heidi Klum
Backstreet Boys
Colbie Caillat
Gavin DeGraw
Carly Rae Jepsen
Gloria Estefan
Luke Bryan
Jenny McCarthy
Brandy
Hayden Panettiere
50 Cent
Neon Trees
will.i.am

Winners and nominees

References

2012
2012 awards in the United States
2012 music awards
2012 in Los Angeles